Melentije Pavlović (Gornja Vrbava, 1776 – Vraćevšnica monastery, 11 June 1833) was the first Serb Metropolitan of Belgrade, head of the Serbian Orthodox Church in the Principality of Serbia from 1831 until his death in 1833, as well as a participant in the Second Serbian Uprising.

Biography

Early life

He was born in Gornja Vrbava, a village near present-day Gornji Milanovac. He joined the monastery before 1810, in March of that year he became Hegumen of the Vraćevšnica monastery. He did not take part in the First Serbian Uprising, but he joined the Second Serbian Uprising, participated in the Takovo Meeting and distinguished himself in the battles of Ljubić and Palež. Thanks to his personal courage, Melentije gained the respect of Prince Miloš Obrenović, who in 1818 appointed him a personal confessor of the Obrenović dynasty. With time, Melentije became his adviser, initially in religious matters and later also in general political matters. In 1823, the Prince entrusted him with the organization of a state school system.

Metropolitan
When the Prince reached an agreement with the Ecumenical Patriarchate of Constantinople on the creation of the autonomous Metropolitanate of Belgrade, he pointed out Melentije as the most appropriate candidate. In recommending Melentije to accept chirotony as bishop, the Prince called him the most honest, the most talented and the most respected among the Serb clergy. Melentije was ordained bishop by the Ecumenical Patriarch of Constantinople Constantius I on 18 August 1831. A year later, the autonomy of the Metropolitanate of Belgrade was confirmed. At that moment he was seriously ill.

Melentije, while holding office, determined the administrative division of the Metropolitanate to eparchies and organized a metropolitan office. He forbade church singing in Greek language in Belgrade churches, and he tried to create a printing house in Belgrade; he himself resided in Kragujevac. According to Radomir Popović, a dispute arose between him and the Prince in the last period of Melentije's administration.

He died in 1833.

References

Sources
 R. Popović, Serbian Orthodox Church in History, Academy of Serbian Orthodox Church for Fine Arts and Conservation, Belgrade 2013.
 Đ. Slijepčević,Istorija Srpske Pravoslavne Crkve, t. II, JRJ, Beograd 2002.

1776 births
1833 deaths
People from Gornji Milanovac
People from the Principality of Serbia
People of the Second Serbian Uprising
Serbian revolutionaries
Metropolitans of Belgrade
Eastern Orthodox Christians from Serbia
19th-century Eastern Orthodox bishops